Ramphis ibericus is a moth in the family Cosmopterigidae. It is found in Spain.

The wingspan is 7–11 mm. Adults are on wing in June and July.

References

External links
lepiforum.de

Moths described in 1969
Cosmopteriginae